Serbs in Belarus are Belarusian citizens of Serbian descent or citizens of Serbia who live and work in Belarus.

History
Serbs inhabited Belarus for different reasons and in different periods of time. Among them were members of noble families, church dignitaries, propagators of all-Slavic ideas, educational reformers, as well as people who were engaged in culture and various scientific disciplines. There were also Serbian fighters in Belarus who fought in the world wars of the twentieth century. In World War I, there were several camps in Minsk, Gomel and other places where Serbian volunteers gathered. It is known that around three hundred Serbs from Bačka and Baranja fought in Belarus as part of fifty partisan units in World War II, and this is evidenced by the lists from the former Party Museum in Minsk. Today, it is estimated that around 1,000 Serbs live in Belarus. The Serbian Center is an active cultural and educational community.

Notable Serbs in Belarus

 Simeon Zorić, Imperial Russian lieutenant-general and count of the Holy Roman Empire, Russian landowner in eastern Belarus
 Simeon Piščević, Serbian and imperial Russian general, governor of the Mahiliou Governorate during Russian rule.
 , Lieutenant General of the Red Army, member of the Central Committee of the Communist Party of Belarus and the Central Executive Committee of the Belarusian Soviet Socialist Republic in 1935-1937.
 Vladimir Picheta, rector and professor of the University of Minsk, compiled the history of Belarus at the time it became a Soviet republic, member of the Russian and Belarusian academies of science.
 Viktar Vuyachych, Ukraine-born singer in the Belarusian SSR

See also

Belarus-Serbia relations
Belarusians in Serbia

References

Belarus–Serbia relations
Ethnic groups in Belarus
Belarus
Belarus
Belarus
Belarus